Upper Borough Walls is a historic street in Bath, Somerset, England. Many of the structures are listed buildings.

It takes its name from the section of the medieval wall of the city which still remains.

The Royal National Hospital for Rheumatic Diseases was founded in 1738 as The Mineral Water Hospital, and is still known locally as The Min. Then, it provided care for the impoverished sick who were attracted to Bath because of the supposed healing properties of the mineral water from the spa. The original building was designed by John Wood the Elder and built with Bath stone donated by Ralph Allen. It was later enlarged, firstly in 1793 by the addition of an attic storey and later in 1860 by a second building erected on the west side of the earlier edifice. It is a Grade II listed building. There is a fine pediment, in Bath stone, on the 1860 building depicting the parable of the good Samaritan.

Number 10 was built between 1800 and 1820, when numbers 11 and 12 were built. Number 11 had a new shop front around 1900. The Full Moon Hotel is slightly earlier having been built between 1780 and 1800.

Numbers 18 and 18A, on the corner of Trim Street were built between 1730 and 1750. Broadleys Vaults Public House and  Gascoyne House also make up a listed building.

See also

 List of Grade I listed buildings in Bath and North East Somerset

References

Grade I listed buildings in Bath, Somerset
Streets in Bath, Somerset